The Georgian mafia is regarded as one of the biggest, most powerful, dangerous and influential criminal networks in Europe, which has produced the largest number of "thieves in law" in all former USSR countries and controls and regulates most of the Russian-speaking and fully controls Russia and Georgia  mafia groups. They are very active in Russia and Europe. The Georgian mafia has two major criminal clans from Tbilisi and Kutaisi. Georgia always had a disproportionately high number of crime bosses and still has a majority of the 700 or so still operating in the post-Soviet space and western Georgia (Kutaisi Clan) is particularly well represented.

In many of its rules or "laws", the Georgian mafia parallels the Sicilian Mafia.

History

Soviet period

Georgia is a small Eurasian state with a population of about four million, of whom two thirds are Georgians, and the national minorities are mainly Russian, Armenian, and Azeri. The geographical position of the country is due to the strategically advantageous junction of important communications from Europe to Asia.

According to foreign researchers, the Georgian criminal traditions were formed long before the October Revolution. It is thanks to cooperation with the Georgian crime that the young and energetic Joseph Stalin so successfully engaged in robbing banks, extorting money and expropriating property from wealthy citizens. In addition to the profit, the revolutionary criminal environment in Georgia contributed to the intimidation of competitors and the holding of high-profile terrorist acts. The rudiments of this system can be seen a century later, as they still permeate the country.

The October Revolution transformed the Georgian underworld just as much as it changed other parts of society. Stalin's ascension to power was accompanied by the corresponding upward movement of representatives of Georgian society. Due to this, the degree of representation of Georgians in the Soviet hierarchy of power was disproportionately high. Interestingly, a similar process was observed in the Soviet criminal underground, where up to a third of strategically important positions were taken by immigrants from Georgia, while the share of the Georgian ethnic group in the general population of the USSR did not exceed 2%.

This trend has often attracted the attention of international scientists. They often pointed out that in Soviet times the Georgian SSR had a very high standard of living due to its well-developed shadow economy, and the Georgian “thieves in law” held key positions in the criminal communities of the entire Soviet Union. Natives of Georgia were engaged in underground production and unrecorded trade throughout the USSR, often siphoning significant resources from the legitimate economy. Georgian farmers earned on the supply of scarce fruits to large Soviet cities a lot of money, and their income could be ten times higher than the average Soviet worker’s earnings. The clan system of the underworld of Soviet Georgia was formed in the 1970s as an association of professional criminals, tsekhoviks and corrupt officials. In those days, when the whole country was huddled in modest small-sized apartments, Georgian officials allowed themselves to build huge apartments for personal use. It is believed that such a lifestyle is associated with an innate culture of ignoring all sorts of rules, which is not so easy to eradicate. As a result, in the 1980s, the allied government had to recognize the existence of organized crime in the country, which served the requests of the ruling elite in exchange for its protection.

Obtaining sovereignty in Georgia is often viewed as a departure of the country from the Soviet methods of economic and political administration, but this view does not reflect reality. At that time, no deep reform of the legislation in Georgia and in other post-Soviet countries was carried out and there was not even an intention to modernize the legal system.

At the dawn of independence of the country, a number of local wars and military conflicts, the course of which largely depended on which side they took a well-organized Georgian criminal groups. After these events, a number of "double flowers", strategically important areas, blossomed previously unknown to local residents of the phenomenon, such as human trafficking, weapons smuggling and illegal drugs. The standard of living in the country has declined much more than in other CIS republics, the system of government has practically ceased to function, and many sectors of the economy (especially the energy sector) were rapidly criminalized. Suddenly it turned out that corruption and organized crime pose a threat to the country no less than Chechen terrorists, who feel at ease in the Pankisi Gorge.

Independent Georgia
During the period leading up to Georgian independence in 1991, as tension grew between Georgians and ethnic Abkhaz several nationalist militias were formed, the two most prominent being the National Guard of Georgia led by ex-convict Tengiz Kitovani and the Mkhedrioni led by former thief-in-law Jaba Ioseliani. Due to an absence of any other means of funding, the militias engaged in protection rackets and smuggling and the weak Georgian government had no choice but to embrace them.

The paramilitaries were first deployed against the separatist regions of Abkhazia and South Ossetia, but attempts by President Zviad Gamsakhurdia to rein them in resulted in a violent coup where he was replaced by Eduard Shevardnadze, who had the backing of the militias, which continued to operate with impunity. The Mkhedrioni took advantage of their position of power to take over the gasoline business. Shevardnadze finally got the excuse he needed to disband the militias in 1995 after an assassination attempt. Ioseliani was imprisoned, although released in 2000 as part of a general amnesty, dying three years later. But other, less idealistic thieves-in-law still continued to dominate day-to-day life in Georgia.

According to Spanish prosecutor Jose Grinda, Georgian mafia led by Dzhaba Iosselani during the 1990s took control of the country and state and then later led by Zakhariy Kalashov during Shevardnadze's rule.

Rose Revolution
In November 2003 a popular uprising known as the Rose Revolution toppled the Shevardnadze's government and put Mikheil Saakashvili 's regime in power. Saakashvili soon implemented a series of reforms aimed at tackling crime and corruption, firing and imprisoning a number of officials as well as making membership of the thieves-in-law a crime in 2005. In response to this as well as harsher prison regimes, several prison riots broke out before being heavy-handedly put down. In order to avoid prosecution, Georgian gangsters fled the country, typically to Russia, Israel and Western Europe.

In Russia
Georgian organized crime has been present in Russia since the Soviet era. During the 1990s, as rival criminal gangs, corrupt law enforcement and oligarchs fought one another for supremacy over the lucrative protection rackets of the emerging private business sector in the chaotic transition to capitalism, the Georgian mafia made its presence known in Moscow. One of the most famous bosses of this period was Otari Kvantrishvili, a former sportsman turned racketeer after a conviction for rape. He would often act as a go-between for various underworld factions and something of a public face for the mafia. Prior to his assassination in 1993, Kvantrishvili spoke of his ambitions to start his own political party. His funeral was attended by many celebrities and politicians, including the singer Joseph Kobzon.

In more recent years, the Georgian underworld in Russia, Georgia and elsewhere has been characterised by a violent feud between the Kutaisi and Tbilisi clans, led by Tariel Oniani and Aslan Usoyan, respectively. The conflict claimed the life of notorious Russian thief-in-law Vyacheslav Ivankov, who was assassinated while attempting to mediate in 2009, while Usoyan was himself killed by a sniper in January 2013.

In Israel

In popular culture
 In the 1988 film Red Heat, Arnold Schwarzenegger portrays a Moscow cop sent to Chicago to bring back a Georgian drug lord Viktor Rostavili / Viktor Rosta.
 The video game Grand Theft Auto: The Ballad of Gay Tony features fictional crime boss Marki Ashvili.
 The video game Deus Ex: Mankind Divided features the fictional Georgian Dvali crime family.
 In Agents of S.H.I.E.L.D. season 1 episode The Hub (1x07), the main antagonist of this episode, Marta (played by Alison Whyte) is a mob boss in the region near the Caucasus Mountains with enough level of influence to help people to cross the South Ossetian borders.

See also
Chechen mafia
Azerbaijani mafia
Armenian mafia

Notes

References

External links
Dozens arrested in swoop on Georgian mafia across Europe
Foreign mafia move in on Italy: The Georgian mafia is encroaching on Italian soil, posing a great threat to the country
Police arrest 69 in 'Georgian mafia' raids
Georgia mafia suspects arrested in six countries
Georgian 'mafia boss' slips Europe-wide police raid
Georgian mafia launders 7 billion dollars in Russia for ‘small victorious war’
Forty arrested in French raids on Georgian 'mafia' gangs
Georgian mafia boss collared in Dunakeszi
European police bust Georgian mafia in raid
Georgia's mafia: the politics of survival
Thieves of the Law and the Rule of Law in Georgia 
The Magnificent Graves of Georgian Mafiosos

Mafia
Organized crime by ethnic or national origin
Transnational organized crime
Organised crime groups in Belgium
Organised crime groups in Georgia (country)
Organised crime groups in Germany
Organized crime groups in Greece
Organised crime groups in Israel
Organized crime groups in Russia
Crime in the Soviet Union